The  is the oldest of the four shinnōke, branches of the Imperial Family of Japan which were eligible to succeed to the Chrysanthemum Throne in the event that the main line should die out.

The Fushimi-no-miya was founded by Prince Yoshihito, the son of the Northern Court Emperor Sukō. As the house was founded by a Northern Pretender, the first three princes are sometimes not recognized as legitimate Fushimi-no-miya Princes.

All of the much later ōke were branches off the Fushimi-no-miya house, all but one of them being created by sons of Fushimi-no-miya Kuniye.

Unless stated otherwise, each prince is the son of his predecessor.

The sesshu shinnōke and ōke households, along with the kazoku (Japanese peerage), were reduced to commoner status during the American occupation of Japan, in 1947.

Family Tree 
This is a family tree of the Fushimi no miya. Numbers provided are given assuming that the Oke are restored

See also 
 Succession to the Japanese throne
 Family Tree of Japanese deities

References 
General

Specific

Japanese
Descent from antiquity
Dynasty genealogy

Japan history-related lists
Lists of Japanese people

References
 Keane, Donald. Emperor Of Japan: Meiji And His World, 1852-1912. Columbia University Press (2005). 
Lebra, Sugiyama Takie. Above the Clouds: Status Culture of the Modern Japanese Nobility. University of California Press (1995). 

 
1408 establishments in Asia
1400s establishments in Japan
Japanese nobility